CM3 may refer to:
Championship Manager 3
Captain Marvel Jr.
the Chelmsford postal area
Center for Microfibrous Materials Manufacturing
cm3 (Cubic centimetre)
Clay Matthews III
Carlton Mellick III